Oakland is a city in California, United States.

Oakland may also refer to:

Canada
 Rural Municipality of Oakland, Manitoba
 Oakland, Nova Scotia
 Oakland Township, Ontario, a historical township in the County of Brant
 Oakland, Essex County, Ontario

United States
 Oakland Township (disambiguation), any of several localities

Alabama
 Oakland, Alabama (disambiguation)
 Oakland, Chambers County, Alabama
 Oakland, Lauderdale County, Alabama
 Oakland, Limestone County, Alabama, near Athens
 Oakland (near Madison), Limestone County, Alabama

California
Oakland, California

Florida
 Oakland, Florida
 Oakland Park, Florida
 Oakland, one of the Neighborhoods of Jacksonville

Georgia
 Oakland, Atlanta, a neighborhood of Atlanta
 Oakland City (Atlanta), a neighborhood in southwestern Atlanta

Illinois
 Oakland, Illinois
 Oakland Township, Schuyler County, Illinois
 Oakland, Chicago

Iowa
 Oakland, Iowa
 Oakland Acres, Iowa

Kansas
 Oakland Township, Clay County, Kansas
 Oakland Township, Cloud County, Kansas

Kentucky
 Oakland, Kentucky
 Oakland, Bracken County, Kentucky

Louisiana
Oakland, Union Parish, Louisiana, a settlement in Union Parish, Louisiana

Maine
 Oakland, Maine, a New England town
 Oakland (CDP), Maine, the primary village in the town

Maryland
 Oakland, Maryland, a town in Garrett County
 Oakland, Caroline County, Maryland
 Oakland Mills, Columbia, Maryland

Michigan
 Oakland Charter Township, Michigan
 Oakland County, Michigan

Minnesota
 Oakland, Minnesota, an unincorporated community
 Oakland Township, Freeborn County, Minnesota
 Oakland Township, Mahnomen County, Minnesota

Missouri
 Oakland, Missouri
 Oakland, Laclede County, Missouri
 Oakland Park, Missouri, a former village now merged with Webb City

Nebraska
 Oakland, Nebraska
 Oakland Township, Burt County, Nebraska

New Jersey
 Oakland, New Jersey, a borough in Bergen County
 Oakland, Salem County, New Jersey

Pennsylvania
 Oakland (Pittsburgh)
 Oakland, Lawrence County, Pennsylvania
 Oakland, Susquehanna County, Pennsylvania
 Oakland Township, Butler County, Pennsylvania
 Oakland Township, Susquehanna County, Pennsylvania
 Oakland Township, Venango County, Pennsylvania

Rhode Island
 Oakland, Rhode Island
 Oakland Beach, Rhode Island

Texas
 Oakland, Cherokee County, Texas
 Oakland, Colorado County, Texas

Wisconsin
 Oakland, Wisconsin (disambiguation)
 Oakland, Burnett County, Wisconsin, a town
 Oakland (community), Burnett County, Wisconsin, an unincorporated community
 Oakland, Douglas County, Wisconsin, a town
 Oakland, Jefferson County, Wisconsin, a town
 Oakland (community), Jefferson County, Wisconsin, an unincorporated community

Other states
 Oakland City, Indiana
 Oakland, Massachusetts
 Oakland, Mississippi
 Oakland Gardens, Queens, New York
 Oakland & Northwood Avenue Area, a neighborhood in Columbus, Ohio
 Oakland, Oklahoma
 Oakland, Oregon
 Oakland, South Carolina
 Oakland, Tennessee
 Oakland Park, Virginia, an unincorporated community of Northampton County
 Oakland, Washington, an unincorporated community

Historic buildings and plantations
 Oakland (Warm Springs, Georgia), a registered historic place in Georgia
 Oakland Plantation House (Gurley, Louisiana)
 Oakland Plantation (Natchitoches Parish, Louisiana)
 Oakland (Bryantown, Maryland)
 Oakland (9 Oakhurst Drive, Natchez, Mississippi)
 Oakland (Lower Woodville Road, Natchez, Mississippi), a registered historic place in Mississippi
 Oakland (Airlie, North Carolina)
 Oakland Plantation (Carvers, North Carolina)
 Oakland Plantation (Tarboro, North Carolina)
 Oakland Plantation (Beech Island, South Carolina)
 Oakland Plantation (Fort Motte, South Carolina)
 Oakland Plantation House (Mount Pleasant, South Carolina)
 Oakland (Dresden, Tennessee), a registered historic place in Tennessee
 Oakland (Gallatin, Tennessee), a registered historic place in Tennessee
 Oakland (Montpelier, Virginia)
 Oakland (Parkersburg, West Virginia)

Educational institutions
 Oakland University, in Oakland County, Michigan
 Oakland City University, in Oakland City, Indiana
 Oakland Community College, in Oakland County, Michigan
 Oaklands College, in Hertfordshire, England

Sports teams
 Oakland Athletics, a Major League Baseball team in California
 Oakland Golden Grizzlies, the intercollegiate athletic program of Oakland University in Michigan
 Oakland Roots SC, a soccer team in California

People
Ethelmary Oakland (1909–1999), American silent film child star
Dagmar Oakland (1893–1989), American actress
Simon Oakland (1915–1983), American actor
Thomas Oakland (1939–2015), American school psychologist

Other uses
Fort Oakland, a defunct post-Civil War fort at the site of present-day Tonkawa, Oklahoma
Oakland Motor Car Company, an American car manufacturer later renamed to Pontiac
 USS Oakland (CL-95), a warship of the U.S. Navy

See also
 
 Oakland Cemetery (disambiguation)
 Oakland Historic District (disambiguation)
 Oakland Plantation (disambiguation)
 Oakland School (disambiguation)
 Oaklands (disambiguation)
 Auckland, the largest city in New Zealand
 Auckland (disambiguation)
"Telegraph Ave. ("Oakland" by Lloyd)", a 2013 song by Childish Gambino from the album Because the Internet